Fautor consobrinus is a species of sea snail, a marine gastropod mollusk in the family Calliostomatidae.

Distribution and habitat
This marine species occurs off the Kermadec Islands, New Zealand, at depths of about 80 m.

References

Gastropods described in 1958